The Hills: New Beginnings is an American reality television show, developed as a sequel to The Hills. The series documents the original cast members as they navigate from the carefree days that were their 20s to the more complicated reality of life in their mid 30s while still living in Los Angeles. The series was canceled after two seasons in January 2022.

Production

Development

The Hills is an American reality television series that aired for six seasons on MTV from May 31, 2006, until July 13, 2010. Developed as a spin-off of Laguna Beach: The Real Orange County, the series aired six seasons and focused on the personal and professional lives of several young men and women residing in Los Angeles, California. Its premise was conceived by Adam DiVello, while Liz Gateley and Sean Travis served as executive producers. On August 20, 2018, at the 2018 MTV Video Music Awards, MTV announced a revival of the series entitled The Hills: New Beginnings, set to air in 2019. On April 2, 2019, it was announced that the series was set to premiere on June 24, 2019.

On July 22, 2019, due to high viewership and ratings, the series was renewed for a second season which premiered on May 12, 2021. Production began in early 2020, with only a few episodes completed filming before being halted in March due to the COVID-19 pandemic. The plan was to resume mid-late summer, with MTV at one point even considering filming in a quarantine bubble. The network ultimately chose against this, and normal production resumed in November 2020 with strict COVID-19 safety protocols in place after California began to lifts its lockdowns. However, due to long delay of season 2, the series received low ratings. On January 18, 2022, MTV canceled the series after two seasons.

Casting
Original cast members Heidi Montag, Spencer Pratt, Stephanie Pratt, Audrina Patridge, Whitney Port, Jason Wahler, Frankie Delgado and Brody Jenner were all set to return. It was revealed by People that Lauren Conrad, the original star of The Hills, would not return for the revival. Us Weekly confirmed that Kristin Cavallari, who replaced Conrad as star of The Hills in season six, and Lo Bosworth, who was a main cast member for season six, would also not return. Us Weekly also reported that Cory in the House star Kyle Massey would have been part of the cast, as well as two bloggers, however, this did not eventuate. Kathy Hilton revealed daughters Paris Hilton, Nicky Hilton and son Barron Hilton II were asked to join but declined. Stephen Coletti also revealed he declined MTV's offer to appear on the series. On October 3, 2018, it was reported that actress Mischa Barton would be joining the cast. Barton starred in the Fox television series The O.C., which inspired the creation of Laguna Beach. Other new cast members included Kaitlynn Carter, Jennifer Delgado and Ashley Wahler, the wives of Jenner, Frankie Delgado and Jason Wahler, respectively. On October 15, 2018, it was confirmed that Brandon Thomas Lee, son of Pamela Anderson and Tommy Lee, would be joining the cast.

In March 2020, Cavallari announced that she was set to appear as a guest star on the second season. In late 2020, it was announced that socialite Caroline D'Amore would have joined the cast of the second season, while Stephanie Pratt and Mischa Barton would have left the series.

Cast

Main cast
 Brody Jenner
 Audrina Patridge
 Heidi Montag
 Spencer Pratt
 Justin Brescia
 Stephanie Pratt (season 1)
 Frankie Delgado 
 Whitney Port (season 1; recurring season 2)
 Mischa Barton (season 1)
 Brandon Thomas Lee
 Jason Wahler (season 2; recurring season 1)
 Ashley Wahler (season 2; recurring season 1)
 Kaitlynn Carter (season 2; recurring season 1)

Supporting cast
 Jennifer Delgado
 Caroline D'Amore (season 2)

Guest stars
 Pamela Anderson (season 1)
 Perez Hilton (season 1)
 Linda Thompson
 Brandon Jenner (season 1)
 Ryan Cabrera (season 1)
 Kristin Cavallari (season 2)

Episodes

Series overview

Season 1 (2019)

Season 2 (2021)

Specials

Reception
On review aggregator Rotten Tomatoes, the series holds an approval rating of 45% based on 11 reviews, with an average rating of 4/10. The website's critical consensus reads, "For a show called New Beginnings, The Hills is unfortunately stuck in its old ways—though for fans looking to catch up with their favorite characters there is plenty of drama to dive back into." On Metacritic, it has a weighted average score of 27 out of 100, based on 4 critics, indicating "generally unfavorable reviews".

References

External links
 

2010s American reality television series
2020s American reality television series
2019 American television series debuts
2021 American television series endings
American sequel television series
English-language television shows
MTV reality television series
The Hills (TV series)
Television shows set in Los Angeles